Themes on an Occult Theory is an EP by Nembrionic Hammerdeath. It was released in 1992 by Displeased Records. It was released only on vinyl and the sleeve came in three different colours: purple, red and cyan. Three of the four tracks were later included on the Bloodcult EP.
It sold about 1700 copies

Track listing
 "Approach to Coincidence" –  3:56 
 "Bow for the Overlord" –  2:11 
 "Yog Sothoth" –  2:57 
 "Against God" –  3:26

Credits
 Jamil Berud - Bass
 Dennis Jak - Guitar
 Noel Derek Rule Van Eersel - Drums
 Marco ("Bor") Westenbrink - Guitar, vocals

References

Nembrionic albums
1992 EPs
Grindcore EPs